Zhanat Zhakiyanov (born 4 November 1983) is a Kazakh former professional boxer who competed from 2007 to 2017. He held the WBA (Undisputed) and IBO bantamweight titles in 2017.

Professional career

Zhakiyanov has been trained by former light-welterweight unified world champion Ricky Hatton since 2013. Zhakiyanov is known for his high workrate and punching power.

Zhakiyanov vs. Kadirov 
Zhakiyanov made his professional debut in August 2007, defeating Nabi Kadirov by unanimous decision on Shymkent.

Zhakiyanov vs. Usarov 
Zhakiyanov suffered his first lost against Sakhib Usarov on his fifth fight.

Zhakiyanov vs. Abdurahimov 
On 2010, Zhakiyanov claimed the ABCO bantamweight title with a unanimous decision over Bahyt Abdurahimov.

Zhakyanov vs. Guerfi 
Zhakiyanov then defeated Karim Guerfi to win the EBU bantamweight title. Guerfi built a lead on the scorecards but Zhakiyanov knocked him out with a right hand at the end of round 5.

Zhakiyanov vs. Edisherasvhili 
In September 2014, Zhakiyanov defeated Gagi Edisherashvili with a first-round knockout. The fight marked his tenth consecutive stoppage win.

Zhakiyanov vs. Guzman 
Zhakiyanov defeated Héctor Guzmán for the WBA International title. Both fighters showed technical deficiencies during the fight, throwing wide, looping punches. Guzmán went down in round 1 and Zhakiyanov went down in round 2, but Zhakiyanov won the fight with a round-6 knockout. In November 2015, he defeated Yonfrez Parejo by split decision (116-113, 115–113, 112–116) for the WBA interim title. The fight halted Zhakiyanov's 12-fight knockout streak.

Zhakiyanov vs. Warren 
In February 2017, Zhakiyanov defeated Rau'shee Warren to win the WBA world title. Zhakiyanov went down twice in round 1, but outworked Warren throughout the rest of the fight and knocked him down in round 3, but the referee ruled it a slip. Zhakiyanov won the fight by split decision (116-110, 115–111, 111–115).

Zhakyanov vs. Burnett 
In August 2017, it was announced that Zhakiyanov would face IBF bantamweight titlist Ryan Burnett on 21 October 2017. Both fighters would be defending their respective world title for the first time against each other. Burnett and Zhakiyanov had previously trained in Hatton's gym together. On fight night, Burnett won a unanimous decision (119-109, 118–110, 117–112) after a tense fight that saw him and Zhakiyanov trade blows in close quarters for most of the twelve rounds.

Professional boxing record

References

External links

Zhanat Zhakiyanov - Profile, News Archive & Current Rankings at Box.Live

1983 births
Living people
Kazakhstani male boxers
Bantamweight boxers
World Boxing Association champions
People from Jambyl Region